The Deputy Chief of Staff for Operations of the United States Air Force is a position in the United States Air Force tasked with the development and implementation of policy directly supporting global operations, force management, weather, training and readiness across air, space and cyber fields. Commonly referred to as the A3, it is held by a lieutenant general who serves  as the operations deputy to the Chief of Staff of the United States Air Force. The position is one of ten senior positions in the Headquarters of the U.S. Air Force. As such, the officeholder of this position serves in the Air Staff.

Organization 
Deputy Chief of Staff for Operations:  Lt Gen James C. Slife
Assistant Deputy Chief of Staff for Operations:  Maj Gen David J. Meyer
Director of Global Operations:  Maj Gen Mark Slocum
Director of Current Operations:  Brig Gen Daniel T. Lasica
Director of Training and Readiness:  Maj Gen Albert G. Miller

List of Deputy Chief of Staff for Operations of the United States Air Force

References

See also 
 Air Staff
 United States Air Force

United States Air Force generals